Matthew Hobar (born January 7, 1987) is an American mixed martial artist who competed in the UFC's bantamweight division. A professional competitor since 2011, Hobar also formerly competed for Legacy Fighting Championship and Shark Fights. He is the former Legacy FC bantamweight champion.

Mixed martial arts career

Early career
Hobar compiled a 5–0 record in smaller organizations before signing with Legacy Fighting Championship.

Legacy Fighting Championship
Hobar faced Steven Peterson at Legacy FC 13 on August 17, 2012. He lost the fight via TKO due to an arm injury in the first round.

A rematch with Steven Peterson took place at Legacy FC 16 on December 14, 2012. He won the fight via majority decision.

He next faced Nelson Salas at Legacy FC 19 on April 12, 2013. He won the fight via unanimous decision.

Hobar faced Angel Huerta for the vacant Legacy FC bantamweight championship at Legacy FC 21 on July 19, 2013. He won the fight via rear-naked choke submission in the first round.

Ultimate Fighting Championship
Hobar stepped in as a replacement for Wilson Reis to face Pedro Munhoz at The Ultimate Fighter Brazil 3 Finale: Miocic vs. Maldonado on May 31, 2014. He lost the fight via TKO in the first round.

Hobar faced Aaron Phillips at UFC Fight Night: Henderson vs. dos Anjos on August 23, 2014. He won the fight via unanimous decision.

Hobar faced Sergio Pettis at UFC 181 on December 6, 2014. He lost the fight via unanimous decision. The bout earned Hobar a Fight of the Night bonus award.

Hobar was expected to face Norifumi Yamamoto on September 27, 2015 at UFC Fight Night 75. However, the bout was scrapped as both fighters suffered injuries during the week leading up to the event.

Matt Hobar officially retired July 2016 due to neck injuries.

Championships and accomplishments
Ultimate Fighting Championship
Fight of the Night (one time) 
Legacy Fighting Championship
Legacy FC bantamweight championship (one time)

Mixed martial arts record

|-
 
|-
| Loss
| align=center| 9–3
| Sergio Pettis
| Decision (unanimous)
| UFC 181
| 
| align=center| 3
| align=center| 5:00
| Las Vegas, Nevada, United States
| 
|-
| Win
| align=center| 9–2
| Aaron Phillips
| Decision (unanimous)
| UFC Fight Night: Henderson vs. dos Anjos
| 
| align=center| 3
| align=center| 5:00
| Tulsa, Oklahoma, United States
| 
|-
| Loss
| align=center| 8–2
| Pedro Munhoz
| TKO (punches)
| The Ultimate Fighter Brazil 3 Finale: Miocic vs. Maldonado
| 
| align=center| 1
| align=center| 2:47
| São Paulo, Brazil
| 
|-
| Win
| align=center| 8–1
| Angel Huerta
| Submission (rear-naked choke)
| Legacy FC 21
| 
| align=center| 1
| align=center| 3:05
| Houston, Texas, United States
| 
|-
| Win
| align=center| 7–1
| Nelson Salas
| Decision (unanimous)
| Legacy FC 19
| 
| align=center| 3
| align=center| 5:00
| Dallas, Texas, United States
| 
|-
| Win
| align=center| 6–1
| Steven Peterson
| Decision (majority)
| Legacy FC 16
| 
| align=center| 3
| align=center| 5:00
| Dallas, Texas, United States
| 
|-
| Loss
| align=center| 5–1
| Steven Peterson
| TKO (arm injury)
| Legacy FC 13
| 
| align=center| 1
| align=center| 4:04
| Dallas, Texas, United States
| 
|-
| Win
| align=center| 5–0
| Aaron Cerda
| Decision (unanimous)
| 24/7 Entertainment 5: America's Most Wanted
| 
| align=center| 3
| align=center| 3:00
| Odessa, Texas, United States
| 
|-
| Win
| align=center| 4–0
| Marcus Baldivia
| Submission (north-south choke)
| Shark Fights 21: Knothe vs. Lashley
| 
| align=center| 1
| align=center| 0:53
| Lubbock, Texas, United States
| 
|-
| Win
| align=center| 3–0
| Jay Flores
| Submission (rear-naked choke)
| Shark Fights 17: Horwich vs. Rosholt 2
| 
| align=center| 1
| align=center| 1:55
| Frisco, Texas, United States
| 
|-
| Win
| align=center| 2–0
| Joshua Davison
| TKO (punches)
| 24/7 Entertainment 1: Professional Cage Fighting
| 
| align=center| 1
| align=center| 0:53
| Midland, Texas, United States
| 
|-
| Win
| align=center| 1–0
| Jeremy Gauna
| Submission (rear-naked choke)
| Shark Fights 14: Horwich vs. Villefort
| 
| align=center| 2
| align=center| 2:16
| Lubbock, Texas, United States
|

See also
 List of current UFC fighters
 List of male mixed martial artists

References

External links
 
 

Living people
American male mixed martial artists
Bantamweight mixed martial artists
Sportspeople from Dallas
1987 births
Ultimate Fighting Championship male fighters